Revisions is 3's fifth full-length album and the third released by Metal Blade Records. On August 26, 2009, 3 announced Revisions, and stating in the liner notes that they felt that those songs "...deserved a second chance, a 'revision,' if you will."

Track listing

"Anyone Human" (1998) - 3:54
"Rabid Animals" (2000) - 4:04
"The Better Half of Me" (2001) - 3:38
"Automobile" (1998) - 4:14
"Why" (2002) - 3:53
"Lexicon of Extremism" (2006) - 2:47
"Fable" (2002) - 4:52
"You’ve Been Shot" (1998) - 4:48
"Halloween" (2002) - 2:59
"The Emerald Undertow" (1998) - 4:43
"The Game" (1998) - 3:52

References

3 (American band) albums
2009 albums